Brad Yoder may refer to:

 Brad Yoder (musician), songwriter/performer who resides in Pittsburgh
 Brad Yoder, actor starring in Red Dirt Rising